Duck TV (stylised ducktv) is a children's television channel which was launched in October 2007 as Bebe TV on UPC and was owned by WICKS Communications, and available in Hungary, Romania, Spain,  Slovakia and Czech Republic. Since its launch, the service also airs in Poland, Bulgaria, Serbia, Croatia, Albania, Montenegro, Malta, Cyprus, Lithuania, Netherlands, Belgium, Luxembourg, Germany, Slovenia, Portugal, Russia, Qatar, UAE, Saudi Arabia, Kuwait, Jordan, Egypt, South Korea, Japan, Sweden, Iceland, Latvia, Estonia, Sri Lanka, United States, Guatemala, Georgia, Turkey and Vietnam, and Canada. In January 2011 it became Duck TV and its ownership was acquired by SlovWest, and now Mega Max Media s.r.o., which remains as the current owner of Duck TV. Duck TV later launched 2 new sister channels: the pay-per-view channel, Movie TV in April 2021, and the premium TV service Crack in July 2022.

Current programming
 Africa
 Animals
 Clifford the Big Red Dog (upcoming in Romanian, Serbian)
Color Magic
Colorwheel
 Dinoland
 Doll Team To The Rescue
Duckschool
 Fireteam
Fireteam in Action
Forms are Yours
 Get Up!
 Good Night
 Hipp-hopp Cactus
 Hop-hop
Hubbi And Friends
Happy Meadow
Happy Kingdom
Happy Garden
Higher The Better
Home Sweet Home
 In The Museum
 India
Lola and the Numbers
 Mimo and Bobo
 Molly of Denali (upcoming Serbian Romanian)
 Monica and Rudy 2
 Monica and Rudy
Nature Dudes
 Ogan
Pixle
Pixle 2
 Planet Jumpers
 Ristorante
 Sounds of Dreams
 Sunville
Sippi Sappi
Sounds Around Us
 The Sweet Life
 Toobys
Tempo Giusto
 Vege-tales
 The World of Animals

Programming blocks
 Bedtime Story
 ducktv Favor on ducktv
 Learn With ducktv
 Let's Move
 Sleep Tight
 Spring on ducktv
 Summer on ducktv
 Winter on ducktv

Screen bugs
Originally, Duck TV displayed a 10-second still shot image of their logo as their digital on-screen graphic thaty would play each segment after 1–3 minutes. This practice has since been discontinued, as Duck TV's current on-screen digital graphic is seen throughout a program that is being broadcast.

References

External links 
Official site

Television channels and stations established in 2007
Television channels in the Netherlands
Television channels in North Macedonia
Children's television networks
Children's television channels in North Macedonia